Kasauli Brewery and Distillery (formerly a brewery and presently a distillery since 1835), at Kasauli in Solan district of Himachal Pradesh state of India, was established in late 1920s during the British Raj by Edward Abraham Dyer. It started producing Asia's first beer brand, the "Lion Beer", and India's first single malt whisky, the ""Solan No. 1". Both of these brands are still in production. After the swap of brewery at Kasauli to Solan distillery and vice versa in 1835, presently Lion beer is produced at Solan and Solan No.1 whisky is produced at the Kasauli distillery using some of the original equipment including the copper pot still. The production of Lion beer was moved 25 km east to Solan Brewery at Solan, due to water scarcity, after civilian Kasauli hill station resort town came up around the brewery. Lion beer was originally an India Pale Ale (IPA), but the beer style was changed to lager in 1960s.

Mohan Meakin, the present owner of Kasauli and Solan breweries and distilleries, has several liquor brands including Old Monk rum; whiskies including Solan No. 1, Diplomat Deluxe, Colonel's Special, Black Knight, and Summer Hall; gins such as London Dry; and Kaplanski vodka, all produced at various production facilities across India.

Kasauli Brewery, with its bar and brewery both open to public till 7 pm, is 9.3 km west from Sonwara railway station on the Kalka–Shimla railway - one of the  UNESCO World Heritage Site Mountain railways of India. Kasauli is located 50 km northeast from Panchkula, 60 km northeast from Chandigarh, 77 km southwest from Shimla - all of which lie on the NH-5. National capital New Delhi is 320 km south. Nearest airports are Chandigarh Airport, Shimla Airport and Delhi IGI Airport.

History

Dyer Brewery

Establishment of Kasauli brewery 

In the late 1820s, Edward Abraham Dyer, father of Colonel Reginald Edward Harry Dyer of Jallianwala Bagh massacre, moved from England to set up  the first brewery in India (later incorporated as Dyer Breweries in 1855) at Kasauli in the Himalayas.

Edward Abraham Dyer brought with him, brewing and distillation equipment from England and Scotland, which came by sailing ship as far up the Yamuna-Ganges rivers as possible, before being loaded onto ox drawn carts and taken up to the Himalayas via the Grand Trunk Road route to Shimla. Later in 1842, a small cantonment of British Indian Army at Kasauli was established by the British colonial rulers.

Edward Dyer selected the location of his brewer due to the fine springwater available there and because the climate at this altitude was similar to the climate of Scotland. His stated ambition was "to produce a malt whisky as fine as Scotch whisky," albeit from much higher highlands. Another reason for this location was that there was a ready market of British troops and civilians in Shimla and elsewhere in Punjab for his products.

Brewery and distillery swap at Kasauli and Solan 

In 1835, the brewery was moved to nearby Solan, close to the British summer capital Shimla, as there was an abundant supply of fresh springwater there. The Kasauli brewery site was converted to a distillery, which Mohan Meakin Ltd. still operates. After the town of Kasauli was established and began using much of the springwater, the brewery was dismantled and moved to nearby Solan where it still operates today. However, the distillery remains at Kasauli and is the oldest operating distillery in Asia and one of the oldest whisky making distilleries in continuous operation anywhere in the world.

Since 1835, Kasauli Brewery is continuously producing the Solan No 1, earlier produced at Solan Brewery, which is India's first single malt whisky and the only malt whisky still produced in Himalayas. Since then, Solan Brewery is continuously producing the Lion beer, earlier produced at Kasauli Brewery, which is Asia's first beer brand.

Expansion and incorporation of business 

Dyer set up more breweries at Shimla, Murree (Murree Brewery), Rawalpindi, Mandalay and Quetta and acquired interests in the Ootacamund Brewery (South India).

In 1855, Edward Dyer incorporated his company it as the Dyer Breweries, following the full establishment of British East India Company rule over the Punjab with the annexation of Punjab in 1849 which brought this area under British law which included the incorporation of companies. Later, more breweries were built across India, Burma and Sri Lanka, and added to it.

By 1882, the company had 12 breweries in India, including one in Rangoon.

Sale of Shimla and Solan breweries to Meakin 

In 1887, another british entrepreneur H. G. Meakin who had moved to India, bought old Shimla and Solan Breweries from Edward Dyer and added more at Ranikhet, Dalhousie, Chakrata, Darjeeling, Kirkee and Nuwara Eliya (Sri Lanka, formerly Ceylon).

Dyer-Meakin merger 

After the First World War, the Meakin and Dyer breweries merged and, in 1937, when Burma was separated from India, the company was restructured with its Indian assets as Dyer Meakin Breweries, a public company on the London Stock Exchange.

Dyer-Meakin's acquisition by Mohan 

In 1949 following independence, Narendra Nath Mohan raised funds and travelled to London, where he bought a majority stake in Dyer Meakin Breweries and acquired all the assets of Dyer Meakin Breweries in India. He built new breweries at Lucknow, Ghaziabad and Khopoli (near Mumbai) and few more breweries across India. The company was restructured and renamed as Dyer Meakin Breweries. It was listed on the London Stock Exchange.

Present status of Mohan Meakin Breweries 

In 1967, the company name was changed to Mohan Meakin Breweries. Kasauli and Solan breweries, along with other breweries, presently continue to be owned by the Mohan Meakin.

Products

Lion beer (at Kasauli 1820s-1835, at Solan since 1835)

Lion Beer, is Asia's first beer brand still continuously in production since 1820s, initially at Kasauli Brewery and since 1835 at Solan Brewery, first as India Pale Ale (IPA) till 1960 and as lager beer thereafter. Lion's popularity with the British during the heyday of the empire led to the start-up of other Lion beers around the world, in New Zealand, South Africa and elsewhere. Lion beer produced in Sri Lanka remains the number-one brand in Sri Lanka, where Mohan Meakin had introduced it in the 1884s through their Ceylon brewery.

In 1820s, Lion Beer was Asia's first beer brand when its production first started with establishment of India's first european style brewery at Kasauli. It which was an India Pale Ale (IPA) in great demand by the thirsty British administrators and troops stationed in the sweltering heat of India. Lion was much appreciated as a beer, and one famous poster featured a satisfied British Tommy declaring, "as good as back home!".

In 1835, the production of Lion beer and the brewery at Kasauli was shifted to Solan near Shimla, and distillery at Solan was shifted to Kasauli.

From 1840s until the 1960s, Lion remained the number one beer in India for over a century. After this, another Mohan Meakin brand, Golden Eagle, took the number one place until the 1980s, when Kingfisher became number one. Lion was originally an  India Pale Ale (IPA) but the beer style was changed in the 1960s to a lager.

In the 1960s, Lion beer's style was changed from India Pale Ale (IPA) to lager after sales had declined.

By 2001, Lion beer sales had declined substantially and Lion was only available to the Indian Army through the Canteen Services Department (CSD). Mohan Meakin then entrusted the marketing of its original beer to International Breweries Pvt. Ltd. The brand has since been relaunched in the north Indian market. With a new label design and marketing campaign, Lion has established itself once more in the civilian market and is now expanding into markets across India.

Solan No.1 whisky (at Solan 1820s-1835, at Kasauli since 1835)

Solan No.1 whisky, is one of the first single malt whiskies which is still in production since 1820s, albeit in a different form. It was initially produced at Solan distillery owned by Dyer. In 1835, its production was moved to Kasauli brewery when swapped distillery at Solan Brewery was moved to Kasauli as a swap due to shortage of springwater for beer production at Kasauli.In 1835, Dyer and Meakin merged, in 1887 Dyer sold the Solan Brewery to Meakin. It is still in production at Kasauli Brewery using some of the original equipment including the copper pot still. Historically, the main whisky brand made by the Kasauli distillery was a well regarded malt whisky named "Solan No. 1" named after the nearby town of Solan. It remains the only malt whisky made in the Himalayas.

Till 1980s, Solan No. 1 was the best selling Indian whisky for over a century. Presently it faces stiff competition from the much larger rivals, which are largely flavoured Indian-made foreign liquor rums distilled from sugar cane juice sold as whisky.

Gallery

See also 

 Kasauli brewery related 
 Beer in India 
 Beer in England 
 Indian whisky
 Scotch whisky
 Other India related
 Alcoholic Indian beverages
 Alcohol laws of India
 Alcohol prohibition in India
 Desi daru
 Dry Days in India
 Indian-made foreign liquor
 Sura
 Tourism in India

References

Economy of Himachal Pradesh
Distilleries in India
Buildings and structures in Solan district
Beer in India
British-era buildings in Himachal Pradesh